Jae-geun, also spelled Jae-keun or Jae-kun, is a Korean masculine given name. Its meaning differs based on the hanja used to write each syllable of the name. There are 20 hanja with the reading "jae" and 18 hanja with the reading "geun" on the South Korean government's official list of hanja which may be registered for use in given names.

People with this name include:
 (1910–1972), South Korean politician; see List of members of the South Korean Constituent Assembly, 1948–50
Im Jae-geun (born 1950), South Korean boxer
In Jae-keun (born 1953), South Korean female democracy activist
Jang Jae-keun (born 1962), South Korean sprinter
Jung Jae-kun (born 1969), South Korean basketball player
Song Jae-kun (born 1974), South Korean short track speed skater

See also
List of Korean given names

References

Korean masculine given names